The Petitbon RP-40 Le Voyageur was a two-seat touring aircraft built in the early 1950s.

Design
The Petitbon RP-40 was a low-wing monoplane intended for amateur construction tourism.

Specifications

References

Aircraft first flown in 1953
1950s French civil utility aircraft
Low-wing aircraft
Single-engined tractor aircraft